The Minister for Māori Crown Relations is a ministerial position within the New Zealand Government responsible for overseeing Te Arawhiti, the Office of Māori Crown Relations. The portfolio is currently held by Labour Party minister Kelvin Davis, who has been in the position since its creation in 2017.

Role and Responsibilities
The role was created in October 2017, following the 2017 New Zealand election and the formation of the Sixth Labour Government. The portfolio differs from the similar Treaty of Waitangi Negotiations portfolio, which is responsible for brokering Treaty settlements between Iwi and the Crown, and is instead responsible for insuring the that Government honors its settlement commitments with Māori. The minister is also responsible for coordinating significant Māori/Crown events, ensuring engagement between the government and Māori is meaningful and providing ministerial oversight to Te Arawhiti: Office of Māori Crown Relations. Inside of cabinet, the holder of the portfolio chairs the Cabinet Māori Crown Relations: Te Arawhiti Committee.

Prime Minister Jacinda Ardern appointed Te Tai Tokerau MP Kelvin Davis to the position following its creation, he was reappointed to the role following the 2020 election and still holds the role. Davis initially expected to be-appointed Treaty Negotiations minister, but his Ngāpuhi heritage proved to much of a conflict of interest, due to Ngāpuhi and the Crown's ongoing efforts to broker a Treaty settlements.

List of Ministers
Key

References

Government of New Zealand